The 2005–06 Iran Pro League was the 23rd season of Iran's Football League and fifth as Iran Pro League since its establishment in 2001. Foolad were the defending champions. The season featured 14 teams from the 2004–05 Iran Pro League and two new teams promoted from the 2004–05 Azadegan League: Shahid Ghandi as champions and Rah Ahan as runner-up. The league started on 2 September 2005 and ended on 21 April 2006. Esteghlal won the Pro League title for the first time in their history (total sixth Iranian title).

Final classification

Results table

Player statistics

Top goalscorers

21
  Reza Enayati (Esteghlal)
17
  Fereydoon Fazli (Est. Ahvaz)
14
  Mehdi Rajabzadeh (Zob Ahan)
11
  Siavash Akbarpour (Esteghlal)
  Ali Daei (Saba Battery)
  Javad Kazemian (Persepolis)
10
  Hossein Badamaki (Aboomoslem)
  Rasoul Khatibi (Sepahan)
9
  Ali Ansarian (Persepolis)
8
  Hadi Asghari (Rah Ahan)
  Sohrab Bakhtiarizadeh (Saba Battery)
  Arash Borhani (Pas Tehran)
  Mohammad Gholamin (Malavan)
  Emad Reza (Foolad)

Top Goalassistants
12
  Gholamreza Eidizadeh (Est. Ahvaz)
10
  Meysam Maniei (Pas Tehran)
  Mehdi Rajabzadeh (Zob Ahan)
7
  Mojtaba Jabbari (Esteghlal)
6
  Milad Maydavoodi (Pas Tehran)
  Mehdi Shiri (Bargh Shiraz)

Cards

Matches played

30
  Mehdi Sabeti (Aboomoslem)
29
  Reza Enayati (Esteghlal)
  Alireza Pourmand (Aboomoslem)
28
  Morteza Asadi (Saba Battery)
  Jalal Hosseini (Saipa)
  Pejman Montazeri (Foolad)
  Hassan Roudbarian (Pas Tehran)
 Almir Tolja (Saba Battery)
  Ali Yahyanejad (Malavan)
27
  Sepehr Heidari (Zob Ahan)
  Pejman Nouri (Persepolis)
  Mehdi Rajabzadeh (Zob Ahan)
  Mojtaba Shiri (Est. Ahvaz)
  Mehdi Tartar (Rah Ahan)

Attendance

Average home attendances

Highest attendance

Notes:Updated to games played on 21 April 2006. Source: iplstats.com

References

Iran Premier League Statistics
Persian League

Iran Pro League seasons
Iran
1